Yurii Nesterov is a Russian mathematician, an internationally recognized expert in convex optimization, especially in the development of efficient algorithms and numerical optimization analysis. He is currently a professor at the University of Louvain (UCLouvain).

Biography
In 1977, Yurii Nesterov graduated in applied mathematics at Moscow State University. From 1977 to 1992 he was a researcher at the Central Economic Mathematical Institute of the Russian Academy of Sciences. Since 1993, he has been working at UCLouvain, specifically in the Department of Mathematical Engineering from the Louvain School of Engineering, Center for Operations Research and Econometrics.

In 2000, Nesterov received the Dantzig Prize.

In 2009, Nesterov won the John von Neumann Theory Prize.

In 2016, Nesterov received the EURO Gold Medal.

Academic work
Nesterov is most famous for his work in convex optimization, including his 2004 book, considered a canonical reference on the subject. His main novel contribution is an accelerated version of gradient descent that converges considerably faster than ordinary gradient descent (commonly referred as Nesterov momentum, Nesterov Acceleration or Nesterov accelerated gradient, in short — NAG). This method, sometimes called "FISTA", was further developed by Beck & Teboulle in their 2009 paper "A Fast Iterative Shrinkage-Thresholding Algorithm for Linear Inverse Problems"

His work with Arkadi Nemirovski in the 1994 book is the first to point out that the interior point method can solve convex optimization problems, and the first to make a systematic study of semidefinite programming (SDP). Also in this book, they introduced the self-concordant functions which are useful in the analysis of Newton's method.

References

External links
 

Living people
Belgian mathematicians
Academic staff of the Université catholique de Louvain
1956 births
Soviet mathematicians
John von Neumann Theory Prize winners
Moscow State University alumni